Holomráz is the second studio album of the Czech pop group Slza. Released on November 3, 2017 by Universal Music. He was recorded in the DC Sound studio from March to September 2017  and his production was in charge of Dalibor Cidlinský. He is also the author of the music by Sla Lukáš Bundil guitarist, lyrics written by musician Xindl X.  The author's trio began composing the song at the beginning of 2017, with the entire album finished in September of that year. The final mix of the album was made by Vlado Meller, holder of two Grammy Awards. The main theme of the album is the slogan "Though Black frost is out, the heat is in us" (in the original: "Ač Holomráz je venku, žár je v nás"), which combines all the songs. According to Petr Lexa, the album was about "passing on a positive view of the world."

Before publishing the album, the band released two digital singles; April 23, 2017, the song "Ani vody proud" and on September 24, 2017 the title track "Holomráz". The album debuted in the Czech charts according to IFPI on the second position. In the hit chart of Hitradio Orion, the Holomráz song is second. In the order of the seventh song "Na srdci", Slovak singer Celeste Buckingham appeared together with the singer of the band Petr Lexa.

Track listing

Personnel 
 Petr Lexa – singing
 Lukáš Bundil – guitar

Other 
 Jan Cidlinský – bass guitar
 Xindl X – composing texts
 Celeste Buckingham – singing in the song "Na srdci"

Technical support 
Dalibor Cidlinský Jr. – production
 Vlado Meller – mix

References 

2017 albums
Czech-language albums
Slza albums
Universal Music Group albums